Ballingeary GAA is a Gaelic football club based in the village of Ballingeary, in County Cork, Ireland.
The club is a member of Cork GAA and Muskerry divisional board.

History

The club was founded in 1957.

Honours
 Cork Minor C Football County Championship Winners (1) 2015. West Cork C League winners 2015. Championship winners 2015.
 Cork Minor C Football County League Winners (1) 2014. Winners West-Cork (1) 2014, Winners League Mid-Cork 2014, County Championship Runners-up
 Cork Intermediate Football Championship Winners (1) 2006
 Cork Junior B Inter-Divisional Football Championship Winners (1) 2015
 Cork Minor B Football Championship Runners-Up 2003
 Cork Minor C Football Championship Winners (1) 2001
 Mid Cork Junior A Football Championship Winners (4) 1965, 1992, 1994, 2005  Runners-Up 1960, 1961, 1963, 1977, 1987, 1989, 1997, 2001, 2003

Famous players
John O'Driscoll

External links
 Ballingeary GAA website
 Cork GAA records

Gaelic football clubs in County Cork
Gaelic games clubs in County Cork